= Amah al-Wahid =

Female Islamic jurist during later Abbasid Era (died 988)

Abbasid mufti and Jurist
- In office 970s–988

Personal life
- Born: Baghdad
- Died: 988 Baghdad
- Era: Later Abbasid era
- Region: Baghdad, al-Iraq
- Main interest(s): Islamic theology, Tawhid, Shafi'i Islamic jurisprudence

Religious life
- Religion: Islam
- Creed: Sunni (Shafi'i)

Amah al-Wahid (died 988) was a mid 10th-century female mufti and Islamic jurist during later Abbasid Era.

== Life ==
She lived in Baghdad. She became known and respected as a noted jurist of the Shafiʽi school. She was a well known teacher and scholar of the Koran and was allowed to make juridical verdicts (fatwas). Her position was very unusual for a woman, but it was not unknown: she was one of two women known in that position in Baghdad, the other one being Umm Isa bint Ibrahim.
